Omari Gudul (born 18 May 1994) is a Congolese professional basketball player who last played for Spójnia Stargard of the PLK. Standing at 6 ft 9 in (2.06 m), Gudul usually plays as power forward or center.

Professional career
In August 2016, Gudul signed his first professional contract with BC Beroe of the Bulgarian NBL. In his first NBL season, Gudul averaged 11.8 points and 6.2 rebounds per game.

On 12 August 2019, he has signed with Craiova of the Romanian Liga Națională.

On 29 June 2020, he has signed with Spójnia Stargard of the PLK.

References

Living people
1994 births
ADA Blois Basket 41 players
Angelo State Rams men's basketball players
BC Beroe players
Centers (basketball)
Democratic Republic of the Congo expatriate basketball people in Bulgaria
Democratic Republic of the Congo expatriate basketball people in France
Democratic Republic of the Congo expatriate basketball people in Spain
Democratic Republic of the Congo expatriate basketball people in the United States
Democratic Republic of the Congo men's basketball players
Joventut Badalona players
Liga ACB players
Power forwards (basketball)
Ranger Rangers men's basketball players
Basketball players from Kinshasa